Perrona is a genus of sea snails, marine gastropod mollusks in the family Clavatulidae.

Description
In this genus the spire is carinated or smooth. The whorls are not tubercular or spinose. The anal sinus can be found more or less near the suture.

Species
Species within the genus Perrona include:
 Perrona aculeiformis (Lamarck, 1816)
 † Perrona anwari Abbass H., 1977 
 † Perrona czarnockii Bałuk, 2003 
 † Perrona descendens (Hilber, 1879) 
 † Perrona estebbunensis Vera-Peláez & Lozano-Francisco, 2001 
 † Perrona harzhauseri Kovács & Vicián, 2021 
 † Perrona heinmoorensis Kautsky, 1925 
 † Perrona inedita (Bellardi, 1877) 
 Perrona jessica Melvill, 1923 (taxon inquirendum)
 † Perrona letkesensis (Csepreghy-Meznerics, 1953) 
 Perrona micro Rolan, Ryall & Horro, 2008
 † Perrona munizsolisi Vera-Peláez & Lozano-Francisco, 2001 
 † Perrona nemethi Kovács & Vicián, 2021 
 † Perrona obeliscoides (Millet, 1854) 
 Perrona obesa (Reeve, 1842)
 Perrona perron (Gmelin, 1791)
 Perrona quinteni (Nolf & Verstraeten, 2006)
 † Perrona robustocarinifera Landau, Harzhauser, İslamoğlu & Silva, 2013 
 † Perrona secunda Lozouet, 2017 
 † Perrona semimarginata (Lamarck, 1822) (fossils from deposits in the Miocene, Burdigalian, Graves near Bordeaux, France) 
 † Perrona servata (Sacco, 1890)
 Perrona spirata (Lamarck, 1816)
 Perrona subspirata (Martens, 1902)
 † Perrona taurinensis (Bellardi, 1877) 
 † Perrona villarrasensis Vera-Peláez & Lozano-Francisco, 2001 
Species brought into synonymy
 Perrona lineata (Lamarck, 1816): synonym of Tomellana lineata (Lamarck, 1818)
 Perrona tritonum Schumacher, 1817: synonym of Perrona perron (Gmelin, 1791)

References

External links
 Schumacher, C. F. (1817). Essai d'un nouveau système des habitations des vers testacés. Schultz, Copenghagen. iv + 288 pp., 22 pls
 Bouchet, P.; Kantor, Y. I.; Sysoev, A.; Puillandre, N. (2011). A new operational classification of the Conoidea (Gastropoda). Journal of Molluscan Studies. 77(3): 273-308

 
Gastropod genera